Palmer is a city in Washington County, Kansas, United States.  As of the 2020 census, the population of the city was 125.

History
Palmer was founded in 1878. It was named for J. Palmer, a teacher.

The first post office in Palmer was established in June 1878.

Geography
Palmer is located at  (39.632737, -97.140028).

Demographics

2010 census
As of the census of 2010, there were 111 people, 50 households, and 34 families residing in the city. The racial makeup of the city was 89.2% White and 10.8% from other races. Hispanic or Latino of any race were 13.5% of the population.

There were 50 households, of which 24.0% had children under the age of 18 living with them, 64.0% were married couples living together, 2.0% had a female householder with no husband present, 2.0% had a male householder with no wife present, and 32.0% were non-families. 32.0% of all households were made up of individuals, and 12% had someone living alone who was 65 years of age or older. The average household size was 2.22 and the average family size was 2.76.

The median age in the city was 50.1 years. 17.1% of residents were under the age of 18; 9.9% were between the ages of 18 and 24; 19.8% were from 25 to 44; 33.3% were from 45 to 64; and 19.8% were 65 years of age or older. The gender makeup of the city was 50.5% male and 49.5% female.

2000 census
As of the census of 2000, there were 108 people, 48 households, and 28 families residing in the city. The racial makeup of the city was 99.07% White and 0.93% Native American. Hispanic or Latino of any race were 2.78% of the population.

There were 48 households, out of which 27.1% had children under the age of 18 living with them, 56.3% were married couples living together, 2.1% had a female householder with no husband present, and 39.6% were non-families. 37.5% of all households were made up of individuals, and 22.9% had someone living alone who was 65 years of age or older. The average household size was 2.25 and the average family size was 2.97.

In the city, the population was spread out, with 24.1% under the age of 18, 4.6% from 18 to 24, 21.3% from 25 to 44, 22.2% from 45 to 64, and 27.8% who were 65 years of age or older. The median age was 44 years. For every 100 females, there were 103.8 males. For every 100 females age 18 and over, there were 105.0 males.

The median income for a household in the city was $31,042, and the median income for a family was $35,625. Males had a median income of $23,750 versus $19,375 for females. The per capita income for the city was $14,670. There were 8.0% of families and 11.8% of the population living below the poverty line, including no under eighteens and 30.0% of those over 64.

See also
 Central Branch Union Pacific Railroad

References

Further reading

External links
 Palmer - Directory of Public Officials
 USD 223, local school district
 Palmer city map, KDOT

Cities in Washington County, Kansas
Cities in Kansas